The 2018 Melbourne Football Club season is the club's 119th year in the VFL/AFL since it began in 1897.

2018 list changes

2017 trades

Retirements and delistings

National draft

2018 squad

2018 season

Pre-season

AFLX

JLT Community Series

Week 1

Week 2

Home and away season

Round 1

Round 2

Round 3

Round 4

Round 5

Round 6

Round 7

Round 8

Round 9

Round 10

Round 11

Round 12

Round 13

Round 14

Round 15

Round 16

Round 17

Round 18

Round 19

Round 20

Round 21

Round 22

Round 23

Ladder

Ladder breakdown by opposition

Tribunal/match review officer cases

Best and fairest== ===Max Gawn

References

External links
 Official Website of the Melbourne Football Club
 Official Website of the AFL

2018
Melbourne Football Club